Chaka Demus EP is an EP released by Jamie T on 31 August 2009. The EP is Jamie T's second release of 2009 following his critically acclaimed Sticks 'n' Stones EP in June and the title track comes from the album Kings and Queens, released on 7 September 2009. Jamie T told The Daily Telegraph that this song was so named because, in its early stages of construction, it superficially sounded to him like Chaka Demus & Pliers.  The video to the lead track was directed by Dan Henshaw and Julian Fletcher, it was inspired by the film, The Cannonball Run. In the UK and Ireland the video was released online exclusively on MUZU.TV on 14 August, and across all platforms on 17 August.

Track listing
"Chaka Demus" - 3:37
"Forgot Me Not (The Love I Knew Before I Grew)" - 4:37
"Planning Spontaneity" - 3:55
"When They Are Gone (For Tim)" - 3:28

References

2009 EPs
Jamie T albums
Virgin Records EPs